Qarağacı (also, Qarahacı, Harahacı, Karagaadzhi, and Karagadzhy) is a village and municipality in the Barda Rayon of Azerbaijan. It has a population of 1,297. 

The village name was changed officially to Qarağacı on May 22, 2007.

References 

Populated places in Barda District